NK Sesvete is a Croatian football club based in the Sesvete district of the city of Zagreb.

History

Radnik Sesvete
Until 8 July 2013 club was known as Radnik Sesvete when it changed its name to the current one. Since the 2011–12 season they play in Druga HNL, Croatia's second level, after winning promotion in the 2010–11 season. It was the club's fifth consecutive promotion since the 2006–2007 season when they played in City of Zagreb's 3rd league (nation's 7th level).

Since 2010 NK Sesvete is Dinamo Zagreb's feeder team and numerous Dinamo's youth players are sent here on loan.

Current squad

External links
Official website 

Football clubs in Croatia
Football clubs in Zagreb
Association football clubs established in 1941
1941 establishments in Croatia